Pseudodyscrasis scutellaris is a species of ulidiid or picture-winged fly in the genus Myennis of the family Ulidiidae.

Distribution
Mexico.

References

Ulidiidae
Insects described in 1830
Taxa named by Christian Rudolph Wilhelm Wiedemann
Diptera of North America
Endemic insects of Mexico